Carl von Weinberg (born September 14, 1861, in Frankfurt am Main; died March 14, 1943, near Florence) was an important Jewish German chemist, entrepreneur, patron of the arts and philanthropist.

Life 

Carl and his brother Arthur von Weinberg, who was one year older, came from a Jewish merchant family; their father was Bernhard Weinberg. In 1880, both brothers were baptized as Protestants. Carl completed a commercial apprenticeship and in 1882, at the age of 21, like his brother, became a partner in the Leopold Cassella & Co. company, which in 1894 merged with the Frankfurt aniline dye factory founded by his uncle Leo Gans and subsequently achieved world fame as Cassella Farbwerke Mainkur in the manufacture of synthetic dyes.

In Niederrad he had settled in 1898 together with his wife May (Ethel Mary Villers Forbes from the house of the Irish Earls of Granard), born in Plymouth in 1866. had the Villa Waldfried built in the English country house style by the architects Aage von Kauffmann and Otto Bäppler. This villa comprised around 100 rooms. It provided space for the couple's important art collection of over 700 objects.

One year before they moved in, their longed-for daughter Wera was born in 1897 (died April 9, 1943, in London), who later married Richard von Szilvinyi. May von Weinberg was famous in Frankfurt as a philanthropist. A chapel was established in the house for the Roman Catholic May. Later, the Niederrad chaplain Georg Nilges celebrated Sunday services in this house chapel. Carl von Weinberg donated a considerable amount for the Niederräder parish Mother of Good Counsel for the construction of a new church. The Italian Renaissance fountain (Florentine fountain) of the house destroyed in the air raids on Frankfurt am Main in World War II has stood since 1952 in the garden of the Nebbienschen Gartenhaus, an artists' meeting place in the Bockenheimer Anlage in downtown Frankfurt. In 1908, the Weinberg brothers were nobilitated.

German delegation to the 1919 Versailles peace negotiations 
In 1919, Carl von Weinberg was a member of the German delegation to the Versailles peace negotiations. In 1924, he took part in the negotiations on German reparations in London, which resulted in the Dawes Plan. In 1925, the Weinberg brothers led Cassella-Farbwerke into a merger to form IG Farbenindustrie AG, where they both served as supervisory and administrative board members.

Together with his brother, Carl von Weinberg donated to various institutions including the University of Frankfurt. In 1921, the Carl von Weinberg School named after him was built in Schwanheim with his support. The founding of the Frankfurt Polo Club in 1913 and the polo grounds can also be traced back to his initiative. He also founded the Waldfried stud farm, which became known far beyond the borders of his hometown.

In 1937 his wife May died, she was buried in the vineyard chapel of the Niederräder church "Mutter vom Guten Rat". Large parts of her estate went to this parish, some parts were given to the former Niederrad chaplain Georg Nilges, who since 1929 was pastor in the newly built Holy Cross Church in Frankfurt-Bornheim in the Bornheimer Hang housing estate.

Nazi Persecution 
With the rise of the Nazis in 1933, the von Weinberg family was persecuted because of their Jewish heritage. Von Weinberg was forced out of his employment and positions. The school and street that had been named after him were renamed. His property was Aryanized, that is transferred in accordance with Nazi law to non-Jews. In 1938, after Kristallnacht,  he was forced to sell his home, Villa Waldfried and his art collection to the city.

The Frankfurt artist Lina von Schauroth, a close friend of the von Weinbergs, managed to bring the four stained glass windows she had created in the private chapel of Villa Waldfried to safety after the owner of the house had fled. During the war they were kept in the Limburg Cathedral Museum and in 1951, at the instigation of the Protestant Synod, they were installed in the nave of the Old St. Nicholas Church on Frankfurt's Römerberg. On the window with the motif "Ascending Christ" on the west side there is the dedication: The glass windows come from the chapel in Waldfried. Carl v. Weinberg donated them in memory of his wife May née Forbes.

After the expropriation of his property, Carl von Weinberg, widowed since 1937, went into exile to his married sister in Italy.

On March 14, 1943, he died near Florence, six days before his brother Arthur died in the concentration camp Theresienstadt. Carl von Weinberg was buried in the mountain cemetery of Chiusi in the grave of his sister's family, who was married to Conté Paolozzi from Chiusi.

Awards 

 In 1927 he was awarded an honorary doctorate from the University of Frankfurt. In 1928 he was awarded the silver plaque of the city of Frankfurt.

After 1945, all name changes were reversed. In addition to the Carl von Weinberg School and Carl von Weinberg Street in Frankfurt's West End, a park with his bust on the grounds of the former Villa Waldfried in Frankfurt-Niederrad commemorates the patron and supporter of Frankfurt

Literature 

 Ernst Mack: Die Frankfurter Familie von Weinberg. Im Zeichen der Kornblumenblüten. Heimat- und Geschichtsverein Schwanheim e. V., Schwanheim 2000, ISBN 3-921606-55-1.
 Angela von Gans, Monika Groening: Die Familie Gans 1350-1963. Verlag Regionalkultur, Heidelberg 2006, ISBN 3-89735-486-1.
 Helene von Schauroth (Hrsg.): Lina v. Schauroth. Eine Frankfurter Künstlerin. Verlag Waldemar Kramer, Frankfurt am Main 1984, ISBN 3-7829-0291-2.
 Hansjörg W. Vollmann: Cassella und ihre Eigentümer. Große Frankfurter Mäzene. Vortrag im Rahmen der Reihe „Mäzene, Stifter, Stadtkultur“ der Frankfurter Bürgerstiftung am Mittwoch, 23. Januar 2013, 19.30 Uhr, Veranstaltungsort: Haus am Dom, Frankfurt, Bad Soden am Taunus, 23. Januar 2013, Vortrag als PDF, retrieved: 3. Januar 2014

Enternal links 

 
 Carl von Weinberg im Portal Frankfurt 1933 bis 1945
 Homepage der Carl-von-Weinberg-Schule
 Bild von May von Weinberg
 Carl von Weinberg bei wollheim-memorial.de
 May von Weinberg (1866-1927) einschließlich ihrer Porträtbüste vom Bildhauer Alexander Archipenko (1887-1967) auf frankfurterfrauenzimmer.de

References 

[[Category:1943 deaths]]
[[Category:1861 births]]
[[Category:Emigrants from Nazi Germany]]
[[Category:People from Frankfurt]]
[[Category:Patrons of the arts]]
[[Category:IG Farben people]]
[[Category:20th-century businesspeople]]
[[Category:19th-century businesspeople]]

1943 deaths
1861 births
Emigrants from Nazi Germany
Jewish art collectors
Patrons of the arts